Igreja de Nossa Senhora da Nazaré (Our Lady of Nazareth Church) is a colonial church in Luanda, Angola, built in 1664. It is located in the centre of the city, overlooking Luanda Bay.

History
The church was built in 1664 by Governor André Vidal de Negreiros (1606–1680) in gratitude to the Virgin Mary for safeguarding his ship during a storm which occurred while he was travelling to Angola. A plaque on the wall, however, indicates it was in fact dedicated to victory at the Battle of Ambuila in 1665. The building was reconstructed in the late 19th century.

Architecture
The little church consists of a rather austere rectangular nave and chancel built in a simple Baroque architecture style. The original plans show that the facade was to be flanked by two towers but these were never built. Instead, there is only a small bell tower. The church was listed as a national monument under Decree No. 135 of 28 June 1932.

References

Roman Catholic churches in Luanda
Roman Catholic churches completed in 1664
1664 establishments in the Portuguese Empire
1664 establishments in Africa
17th-century Roman Catholic church buildings in Angola